The Anti-Terrorist Center or Counterterrorism Centre is a permanent body of the Security Service of Ukraine that was created in 1998. It coordinates the activities of counterterrorism entities, to prevent terrorist acts against state officials, critical objects of population life support, objects of heightened danger, and to prevent and terminate actions that threaten the life and health of significant numbers of people.

Operations
 War in Donbass (2014–2022)
 2022 Russian invasion of Ukraine (2022–present)

Composition
 Civil–Military Administrations, established as temporary local government units on territories of the Anti-Terrorist Operation.

References

External links
 Anti-Terrorist Center at the Security Service of Ukraine webpage


Law enforcement agencies of Ukraine
Ukrainian intelligence agencies
Security Service of Ukraine